Boa Entrada is a settlement in Lobata District on São Tomé Island in São Tomé and Príncipe. Its population is 700 (2012 census). It lies 3 km south of Conde, 3 km southeast of Agostinho Neto and 8 km west of the capital São Tomé. Boa Entrada grew around the plantation complex Roça Boa Entrada, established in 1870. Cocoa, bananas, breadfruit and copra were cultivated here.

Population history

References

External links

Roça Boa Entrada - As Roças de São Tomé

Populated places in Lobata District